The Haitian Tèt Kale Party (PHTK) is a Haitian political party. Tèt Kale means "Bald Headed" in Haitian Creole.

History
The party was formally constituted on 16 August 2012. Although then President Michel Martelly was never a member of the party, PHTK had affinities with the government.

For the 2015 presidential election, Jovenel Moïse was presented as the party's candidate. For the 2015 parliamentary elections, the party presented 11 candidates for the Senate and 99 for the Chamber of Deputies. On the first round of the legislative elections, four PHTK candidates were immediately elected. The party now holds 26 seats in the Chamber of Deputies and two seats in the Senate. The party's presidential candidate Jovenel Moïse, endorsed by country president Michel Martelly, won most votes in the first round in the 2015 presidential election and won the November 2016 Haitian presidential election after the previous election was annulled. In the early morning hours of July 7, 2021, Moïse was assassinated during an attack on his home.

Criticism
After the controversial first round of the 2015 presidential election, the party was described as "corrupt" and "dysfunctional" by some Haitians and Haitian Americans. According to a Haitian Sentinel article, many Haitian Americans living in Miami criticized the party as "thieves".

References

External links
Haitian Tèt Kale Party on Facebook

2012 establishments in Haiti
Conservative liberal parties
Conservative parties in North America
Liberal parties in North America
Political parties established in 2012
Political parties in Haiti